Crepitus is "a grating sound or sensation produced by friction between bone and cartilage or the fractured parts of a bone".

Various types of crepitus that can be heard in joint pathologies are:
Bone crepitus: This can be heard when two fragments of a fracture are moved against each other.
Joint crepitus: This can be obtained when the affected joint is passively moved with one hand, while the other hand is placed on the joint to feel the crepitus.
Crepitus of bursitis: This is heard when the fluid in the bursa contains small, loose fibrinous particles.
Crepitus of tenosynovitis: From inflammation of the fluid-filled sheath (synovium) that surrounds a tendon.

Causes
The sound can be created when two rough surfaces in an organism's body come into contact—for example, in osteoarthritis or rheumatoid arthritis when the cartilage around joints erodes and the surfaces in the joint grind against one another, or when the two fractured surfaces of the broken bones rub together. Crepitus is a common sign of bone fracture.

Crepitus can easily be created and observed by exerting a small amount of force on a joint, thus 'cracking it'. This is caused by bubbles of nitrogen forming in the synovial fluid bursting. Almost every joint in the body can be 'cracked' in this way, but the joints which require the least amount of effort include the hallux, knuckles and neck joints.

In soft tissues, crepitus can be produced when gas is introduced into an area where it is normally not present. 

The term can also be used when describing the sounds produced by lung conditions such as interstitial lung disease; these are also referred to as "rales". Crepitus is often loud enough to be heard by the human ear, although a stethoscope may be needed to detect instances caused by respiratory diseases. 

In times of poor surgical practice, post-surgical complications involved anaerobic infection by Clostridium perfringens strains, which can cause gas gangrene in tissues, also giving rise to crepitus.  

Subcutaneous crepitus (or surgical emphysema) is a crackling sound resulting from subcutaneous emphysema, or air trapped in the subcutaneous tissues.

See also
 Cracking joints

Further reading

External links 
 

Medical signs